Savon Scarver is an American football wide receiver. He played college football at Utah State.

High school career 
Scarver played high school football at Centennial High School in Las Vegas. Scarver was a three-star recruit coming out of high school and committed to play football at Utah State.

College career 
After recording 156 receiving yards, two receiving touchdowns, 742 return yards, and two return touchdowns, he was named a Consensus All-American as an all-purpose back. For his efforts, he was named the recipient of the 2018 Jet Award, given to the top return specialist in college football.

Professional career

Chicago Bears 
Scarver signed with the Chicago Bears as an undrafted free agent on May 6, 2022, but was waived three days later.

Ottawa Redblacks 
Scarver signed with the Ottawa Redblacks as a member of their practice squad on September 22, 2022.

References 

Living people
All-American college football players
Players of American football from Nevada
Sportspeople from Las Vegas
Utah State Aggies football players
Chicago Bears players
Ottawa Redblacks players
1998 births